This list contains the names of the centers and institutes at the Perelman School of Medicine at the University of Pennsylvania in alphabetical order with their external links.

 Abramson Cancer Center – http://penncancer.org/
 Brain Behavior Lab (Department of Psychiatry) – http://www.med.upenn.edu/bbl/
 Center for Bioethics – http://bioethics.upenn.edu/
 Center for Biomedical Image Computing and Analytics – http://www.cbica.upenn.edu/
 Center for Brain Injury and Repair (Department of Neurosurgery) – http://www.med.upenn.edu/cbir/
 Center for Cancer Pharmacology (Department of Pharmacology) – http://www.med.upenn.edu/ccp/
Center for Cellular Immunotherapies – https://www.med.upenn.edu/cci/
 Center for Clinical Epidemiology and Biostatistics – http://www.cceb.upenn.edu/
 Center for Cognitive Therapy (Department of Psychiatry) – http://www.med.upenn.edu/cct/
 Center for Community-Based Research and Health Disparities (Department of Psychiatry) – https://web.archive.org/web/20120308173351/http://www.med.upenn.edu/ccrhd/
 Center for Digestive, Liver, and Pancreatic Medicine – http://www.med.upenn.edu/jointcenterfordighealth/
 Center for Evidence-Based Practice – http://www.uphs.upenn.edu/cep/
 Center for Functional Neuroimaging (Department of Radiology and Neurology) – http://www.cfn.upenn.edu/
 Center for Genetics and Complex Traits (Center for Clinical Epidemiology and Biostatistics) – http://www.cceb.upenn.edu/pages/cgact/
 Center for Healthcare Improvement & Patient Safety (Department of Medicine) – http://www.med.upenn.edu/chips
 Center for Health Incentives and Behavioral Economics at the Leonard Davis Institute – http://chibe.upenn.edu/
 Center for Interdisciplinary Research on Nicotine Addiction (Department of Psychiatry) – http://www.med.upenn.edu/cirna/
 Center for Mental Health Policy and Services Research (Department of Psychiatry) – http://www.med.upenn.edu/cmhpsr/
 Center for Molecular Studies in Digestive and Liver Disease (Department of Medicine) – http://www.med.upenn.edu/molecular/
 Center for Neurobiology and Behavior (Department of Psychiatry) – http://www.med.upenn.edu/cnb/
 Center for Neurodegenerative Disease Research (Department of Pathology and Laboratory Medicine) – http://www.med.upenn.edu/cndr/
 Center for Preventive Ophthalmology and Biostatistics (Department of Ophthalmology) – http://www.med.upenn.edu/cpob/
 Center for Psychopathology Research (Department of Psychiatry)
 Center for Psychotherapy Research (Department of Psychiatry) – http://www.med.upenn.edu/cpr/
 Center for Public Health Initiatives – http://www.cphi.upenn.edu/
 Center for Research on Reproduction and Women's Health – http://www.med.upenn.edu/crrwh/
 Center for Resuscitation Science (Department of Emergency Medicine) – http://www.med.upenn.edu/resuscitation/
 Center for Sleep and Circadian Neurobiology – http://www.med.upenn.edu/sleepctr/
 Center for Studies of Addictions (Department of Psychiatry) – http://www.med.upenn.edu/csa/
 Center for the Prevention of Suicide – http://www.med.upenn.edu/suicide/
 Center for the Treatment and Study of Anxiety (Department of Psychiatry) – http://www.med.upenn.edu/ctsa/
 Center for Translational Research (Department of Psychiatry)
 Center for Weight and Eating Disorders (Department of Psychiatry) – http://www.med.upenn.edu/weight/research.shtml
 Center of Excellence in Environmental Toxicology (Department of Pharmacology) – http://www.med.upenn.edu/ceet/
 Center on the Continuum of Care (Department of Psychiatry) – http://www.med.upenn.edu/ccc/index.html
 Clinical and Translational Research Center (Institute for Translational Medicine and Therapeutics) – http://www.itmat.upenn.edu/ctsa/
 Eldridge Reeves Johnson Foundation (Department of Biochemistry and Biophysics) – http://www.uphs.upenn.edu/biocbiop/jf/jf.html
 Institute for Diabetes, Obesity and Metabolism – http://www.med.upenn.edu/idom/
 Institute for Environmental Medicine – https://web.archive.org/web/20120120233850/http://health.upenn.edu/ifem/
 Institute for Immunology – http://www.med.upenn.edu/ifi/
 Institute for Medicine and Engineering – http://www.uphs.upenn.edu/ime/
 Institute for Regenerative Medicine – http://www.irm.upenn.edu/
 Institute for Strategic Threat Analysis and Response – https://archive.today/20020816200321/http://www.istar.upenn.edu/
 Institute for Translational Medicine and Therapeutics – http://www.itmat.upenn.edu/
 Institute on Aging – http://www.med.upenn.edu/aging/
 Leonard Davis Institute of Health Economics – http://ldi.upenn.edu/
 The Mahoney Institute of Neurological Sciences – http://www.med.upenn.edu/ins/
 Penn Alzheimer's Disease Center (Department of Pathology and Laboratory Medicine) – http://www.pennadc.org/
 Penn Cardiovascular Institute – http://www.med.upenn.edu/cvi/
 Penn Center for AIDS Research – http://www.uphs.upenn.edu/aids/
 Penn Center for Clinical Immunology (Department of Medicine) – http://www.med.upenn.edu/pcci/
 Penn Center for the Integration of Genetic Healthcare Technologies (Department of Medicine) – https://web.archive.org/web/20111119002428/http://www.med.upenn.edu/penncight/
 Penn Center for Musculoskeletal Disorders (Department of Orthopaedic Surgery) – http://www.med.upenn.edu/pcmd/
 Penn Comprehensive Neuroscience Center – http://www.uphs.upenn.edu/penncnc/
 Penn Epigenetics Program (Department of Cell and Developmental Biology) – http://www.med.upenn.edu/epigenetics/
 Penn Genome Frontiers Institute – http://www.genomics.upenn.edu/
 Penn Institute for Biomedical Informatics – https://ibi.med.upenn.edu/
 Penn Lung Center (Department of Medicine) – http://www.uphs.upenn.edu/lungctr/
 Penn Neurodegeneration Genomics Center (Department of Pathology and Laboratory Medicine) – http://www.med.upenn.edu/pngc/ 
 Penn Transplant Institute – http://www.pennmedicine.org/transplant/
 Penn Udall Center for Parkinson's Research (Department of Pathology and Laboratory Medicine) – http://www.med.upenn.edu/udall/
 The Pennsylvania Muscle Institute – http://www.med.upenn.edu/pmi/
 Scheie Eye Institute (Department of Ophthalmology)
 The University of Pennsylvania Smell and Taste Center (Department of Otorhinolaryngology) - https://www.med.upenn.edu/smellandtastecenter/

References

University of Pennsylvania
Research institutes in Pennsylvania
Pennsylvania education-related lists
Clinical trials
Medical lists